Sif is a Norse goddess and the wife of Thor.

Sif or SIF may also refer to:

Sif 
 Sif (character), the Norse goddess as portrayed in Marvel Comics
 Sif (Marvel Cinematic Universe), the character's portrayal in the MCU
 Sif, the official Swedish name for the Swedish Union of Clerical and Technical Employees in Industry
 Sif (or se'if in Hebrew), a subsection in the Shulkhan Arukh (Code of Jewish Law)
 Sif, Yemen
 Sif Glacier, Northern Greenland
 Siamou language (ISO 639:sif)
 4484 Sif, a main-belt asteroid
 Sif Mons, a shield volcano in Eistla Regio on Venus
 Sif, the Great Grey Wolf, a boss character in the video game Dark Souls

SIF

Organizations 
 Central European Institute of Philosophy (SIF) (Czech: Středoevropský Institut Filosofie)
 Italian Physical Society (Italian: Società Italiana di Fisica)
 Save Indian Family, a men's rights movement in India
 Science of Identity Foundation, a religious organization based in Hawaii, United States
 Seychelles Islands Foundation, manages and protects the World Heritage Sites of Aldabra and Vallee de Mai
 Shropshire Islamic Foundation
 Singapore International Foundation, a non-profit organisation in Singapore
 Society for Individual Freedom, a United Kingdom-based association promoting individual freedom
 Somali Islamic Front, also known as Jabhatul Islamiya
 Sons of Italy Foundation, a philanthropic subsidiary of the Order Sons of Italy in America

Science and technology 
 Safety instrumented function, a form of industrial process control
 Schools Interoperability Framework, a data sharing specification (XML data standard and SOA infrastructure standard) for K-12 education institutions in the US, UK and AU
 Selective Identification Feature, modes used to identify aircraft
 Small intensely fluorescent cell, interneurons of the sympathetic ganglia
 Source Input Format (MPEG-1)
 Standard Interchange Format, a data format for Geographic Data defined in FGDC-STD-001-1998
 Stress intensity factor, used in fracture mechanics to predict the stress state

Sport clubs 
 SÍF Sandavágur, a Faroese Football club
 Sandvikens IF, a Swedish football club
 Silkeborg IF, a Danish football club
 Stavanger IF, a Norgwegian football and handball club
 SIF Stadion, the home sports venue of the Stavanger IF team
 Stocksunds IF, a Swedish sportsclub in Stocksund
 Strømsgodset IF, a Norwegian football club from Drammen and their professional team Strømsgodset Toppfotball
 Stattena IF, a Swedish football club in Helsingborg

Other uses 
 Specialized Investment Fund, a type of Investment Fund
 Staten Island Ferry, operated by the New York City Department of Transportation
 Love Live! School Idol Festival, School Idol Festival, a mobile game as part of the Love Live! franchise

See also 
 Short Interframe Space (SIFS), the small time interval between the data frame and its acknowledgment